William Brendan Carmody (27 July 1889 – 7 April 1953) was an Australian rules footballer who played for the Carlton Football Club in the Victorian Football League (VFL). He later served in World War I.

Notes

External links 

		
Bill Carmody's profile at Blueseum

1889 births
1953 deaths
Australian rules footballers from Melbourne
Australian Rules footballers: place kick exponents
Carlton Football Club players
Prahran Football Club players
Australian military personnel of World War I
People from Flemington, Victoria
Military personnel from Melbourne